The Czech Astronomical Olympiad is organised for pupils of elementary and secondary schools in the Czech Republic. It is very popular among younger pupils because of the opportunity it provides to use all informational resources (with the exception of the help of other persons). Practical observational tasks are required in the correspondence round. After the final round of categories "EF" and "CD", a two-day workshop is held to select candidates for the International Astronomy Olympiad. The Czech Astronomical Olympiad is supported by the Ministry of Education, Youth, and Sports as a science competition in category A.

History
The Astronomical Olympiad was first held in the academic year 2003/2004 in the category "EF" (for the 8th and 9th class elementary schools), and the corresponding classes of grammar schools. In the fourth year, 2006/2007, the event grew to include category "GH" (for the 6th and 7th class elementary schools), and in the fifth year, 2007/2008, the category "CD", for first– and second–year secondary school students was added.

Structure

School round
The school round is a 40-minute problem addressed to the student at their school under the supervision of a teacher, or held at the observatory. This round runs from mid-September to mid-December.

Correspondence round
The correspondence stage is a project done at home with up to 2.5 months for completion. This round is held from January to mid-March.

Final round
The best participants of the correspondence round are invited to the National Finals (usually 25 participants in each category). Finals are held in Ostrava (category "CD") and Prague (categories "EF" and "GH") in the second half of May.

Workshop
A workshop for the best participants of "CD" and "EF" categories follows at the observatory in Valašské Meziříčí in mid-June. Candidates for the International Astronomy Olympiad are selected here.

International Astronomy Olympiad
The International Astronomical Olympiad (IAO) is a nine-day event that usually takes place between 23 September and 22 November. The XII. IAO in 2007 brought a Czech team a silver medal, and the 2008 event, XIII. IAO, saw Czechs win two bronze medals. The 2009 International Astronomy Olympiad ended with Czechs winning two silver (senior group competitors) and three bronze (junior group competitors) medals.

Other astronomical competitions in Czech republic
Astronomická Korespondenční Soutěž (Astronomical correspondence competition)

See also
 Czech Astronomical Society (in Czech)

External links
 Czech astronomical olympiad (in Czech)
 Czech astronomical society (in Czech)
 The International Astronomical Olympiad
 Window Into Space

Astronomy events
Education in the Czech Republic
Science events in the Czech Republic